Pultenaea vrolandii, commonly known as cupped bush-pea, is a species of flowering plant in the family Fabaceae and is endemic to south-eastern continental Australia. It is an erect shrub with hairy, arching branchlets, elliptic to egg-shaped leaves, and yellow to orange and red to brown flowers.

Description

Taxonomy and naming
Pultenaea vrolandii was first formally described in 1905 by Joseph Maiden in The Victorian Naturalist from specimens collected "on the summit of a granite hill ... in the Strathbogie Ranges, Victoria" by Mr. Anton Vroland of Strathbogie State School. The specific epithet (vrolandii) honours the collector of the type specimens.

Distribution and habitat
Cupped push-pea grows in woodland and forest south from near Braidwood and Holbrook in New South Wales to scattered areas of eastern Victoria, including the Strathbogie Ranges and near Licola.

References

vrolandii
Flora of Victoria (Australia)
Flora of New South Wales
Plants described in 1905
Taxa named by Joseph Maiden